Sextus is an ancient Roman praenomen or "first name". Its standard abbreviation is Sex., and the feminine form would be Sexta. It is one of the numeral praenomina, like Quintus ("fifth") and Decimus ("tenth"), and means "sixth". Although it is sometimes thought that these names originally referred to birth order and were then handed down through the family line, they may have also been a reference to the month of birth. Similar names were used among the Sabellians. The gens name Sextius is a related form.

Among those named Sextus are:
 Sextus Julius Africanus
 Sextus Appuleius
 Sextus Afranius Burrus
 Sextus Julius Caesar
 Sextus Aelius Paetus Catus
 Sextus of Chaeronea (nephew of Plutarch, he and Sextus Empiricus may be one and the same)
 Sextus Empiricus (he and Sextus of Chaeronea may be one and the same)
 Sextus Julius Frontinus
 Sextus Martinianus
 Sextus Tigidius Perennis
 Sextus Pompeius (younger son of Pompey the Great)
 Sextus Pompeius (relatives of Pompey the Great)
Sextus Pompeius Festus (latter 2nd century), a Roman grammarian
 Sextus Pomponius
 Sextus Propertius
 Sextus Cornelius Repentinus
 Sextus Roscius
 Sextus Julius Severus
 Sextus Tarquinius
 Sextus Attius Varus

See also 
 Bissextus
Sentences of Sextus

References

Ancient Roman prosopographical lists

hu:Sextus